The Battle of Unaizah took place during the early stage of the Saudi-Rashidi War. Abdul Aziz captured Unaizah (Anaiza) in March 1904, killing 370 while losing only two men.

References

Ottoman Arabia
Unaizah 1904
1904 in Saudi Arabia
Unaizah 1904